The quality press or the qualities are those British newspapers in national circulation distinguished by their seriousness.  The category used to be called "broadsheet" until several papers adopted a tabloid printing format. Both The Times and The Independent adopted a tabloid format in 2004. The Guardian adopted a Berliner format in 2005, before switching to tabloid in January 2018.

Circulation figures for the quality press have been falling in recent times, and in December 2009 it was reported that readership of The Guardian, The Independent, The Times, and Financial Times had decreased over the previous 12 months.

"Quality press" titles

References

Mass media in the United Kingdom